Bureaucratic inertia is the supposed inevitable tendency of bureaucratic organizations to perpetuate the established procedures and modes, even if they are counterproductive and/or diametrically opposed to established organizational goals. This unchecked growth may continue independently of the organization's success or failure. Through bureaucratic inertia, organizations tend to take on a life of their own beyond their formal objectives.

Examples

Government
The United States Department of Agriculture has offices in almost all U.S. counties, even though only 14% of counties have valid farms or existing agricultural relevancy.

Business
The Boston Consulting Group has advised firms to cut down on bureaucratic inertia and advised firms to eliminate cruft, bloat, and redundancy in the aspects of the business which are not front-line for the consumer (i.e. the "face" of the company who the customer deals with and who the customer thinks is the value-provider of the company).

References 

Government
Organizational theory
Political science
Bureaucratic organization